Mosquito Creek may refer to:
 Mosquito Creek (British Columbia), a creek at North Vancouver district of British Columbia 
Mosquito Creek (Feather River), a California tributary of the North Fork Feather River
Mosquito Creek (Iowa), a tributary of the Missouri River
Mosquito Creek (Lake Oroville), a California tributary of the Feather River source
Mosquito Creek (Pennsylvania), a tributary of the West Branch Susquehanna River
Mosquito Creek, Queensland, a locality in Queensland, Australia
Mosquito Creek (Tawana Creek), a stream in Ohio
Mosquito Creek (South Dakota), a stream in South Dakota
Mosquito Creek (Virginia), a tributary of Chincoteague Bay
Mosquito Creek (Wisconsin River tributary), a stream in Wisconsin
 Mosquito Creek Lake, reservoir in Trumbull County, northeast Ohio

See also